The 1998 Aiquile earthquake occurred on May 22 at  in Bolivia. This strike-slip earthquake had a moment magnitude of 6.6 and a maximum Mercalli intensity of VIII (Severe). Damage was severe, with at least 95 deaths, 50–150 injuries, and 6,900 homeless.

See also 
 Lists of earthquakes
 List of earthquakes in 1998

References

Further reading

External links
M 6.6 - Cochabamba, Bolivia – United States Geological Survey

Earthquakes in Bolivia
1998 earthquakes
May 1998 events in South America
1998 in Bolivia
1998 disasters in Bolivia